R. Charlton, who lived in the early nineteenth century, was a Tyneside poet/songwriter.

Details
R. Charlton (lived ca. 1812) was a Tyneside songwriter, who, according to the information given by Thomas Allan in the Allan's Illustrated Edition of Tyneside Songs published in 1891, has the song "Newcastle Improvements" attributed to his name.
						
The song is sung to the tune of "Canny Newcassel" according to W & T Fordyce. It is written in Geordie dialect and has a strong Northern connection). Unlike the others songwriters who wrote about the town improvements and mentioned changes to layout, street plans, new buildings etc., Charlton concentrated on the social changes brought about by the work, and sometimes not too kindly.
						
The same song without any comment, except the author's name, appears on page 159 of The Tyne Songster published by W & T Fordyce published in 1840 and on page 151 of A Collection of Songs, Comic, Satirical, and Descriptive published by Thomas Marshall published in 1829

Nothing more appears to be known of this person, or their life, or even their Christian name or sex.

See also 
Geordie dialect words				
(Geordie) Rhymes of Northern Bards by John Bell Junior			
John Bell (folk music)

References

External links
 Rhymes of Northern Bards by John Bell Junior – see pages 247 & 249
 The Tyne Songster by W & T Fordyce 1840
 Marshall's A Collection of Songs, Comic, Satirical, and Descriptive 1829
  Allan's Illustrated Edition of Tyneside Songs and Readings - 1891

English songwriters
English male poets
Year of birth unknown
Year of death unknown
People from Newcastle upon Tyne (district)
Musicians from Tyne and Wear
Geordie songwriters